The Jewish Quarterly Review is a quarterly peer-reviewed academic journal covering Jewish studies. It is published by the University of Pennsylvania Press on behalf of the Herbert D. Katz Center for Advanced Judaic Studies (University of Pennsylvania). The editors-in-chief are David N. Myers (UCLA) and Natalie Dohrmann (University of Pennsylvania). It is available online through Project MUSE and JSTOR.

The journal was established in London in 1889 by Israel Abrahams and Claude G. Montefiore as an English-language concurrent of the French Revue des études juives, itself an outgrowth of the Wissenschaft des Judentums movement. It is the oldest English-language journal of Judaic scholarship.

References

External links
 
 The Jewish Quarterly Review at JSTOR

Judaic studies journals
Quarterly journals
Publications established in 1888
English-language journals
University of Pennsylvania Press academic journals